USS Covington may refer to: 

 , a side wheel steamer, purchased by the Union during the American Civil War
 , a troop transport ship damaged by the German submarine  and scuttled in 1918
 , a  built during World War II

United States Navy ship names